Barred o (capital: Ɵ, lowercase: ɵ) is a letter in several Latin-script alphabets.

Historic examples include the Azerbaijani alphabet used between 1922 and 1933 and its successor, the Uniform Turkic Alphabet (including its versions like Jaꞑalif and the Azerbaijani alphabet used between 1933 and 1939), in which it represented the open-mid front rounded vowel .

In many alphabets it was replaced by the Cyrillic letter Ө ө in 1939. In Azerbaijani, it was again replaced by the Latin letter Ö ö in 1991. 

The Tatar Latin alphabet devised in the late 1990s by the Tatarstan authorities included the letter Ɵ ɵ. The letter is also part of the African reference alphabet.

In the International Phonetic Alphabet, the lowercase  (originally a closed e, later reinterpreted as a barred o) represents the close-mid central rounded vowel.

The letter is not to be confused with the slashed zero, slashed O (Ø ø), the similar Latin letter Ꝋ ꝋ, the Cyrillic letter fita (Ѳ ѳ) and Oe (Ө ө), the Greek theta (Θ θ), Tifinagh letter yab (ⴱ), or the Plimsoll symbol (⦵), despite their similar shapes.

Unicode

See also
Azerbaijani alphabet
Latin letter Ö ö
Cyrillic letter Ө ө
Kɵpejek - a coin in Tuva

External links
Azerbaijani language, alphabets and pronunciation by omniglot.com

Phonetic transcription symbols
Latin-script letters
Vowel letters